The 2009 Chakwal mosque bombing occurred on 5 April 2009, in Chakwal in the Punjab province of Pakistan. An initial casualty count of 30 was reported with at least 150 injuries. The mosque was reportedly "packed" at the time of the explosion. The attack occurred during a religious congregation

Background
Chakwal  is a town located in the Pakistani province of Punjab.

The bombing of the Chakwal mosque came just over a week after another mosque bombing in the Federally Administered Tribal Areas. The attack also occurred at a minority Shia mosque.

Follow up
The attack came a day after eight paramilitary soldiers were killed in a suicide attack in the capital Islamabad.

Attack
There was no immediate claim of responsibility though security officials said they believed the attack to be a result of a suicide bombing. The attack also came only days after Tehreek-e-Taliban leader Baitullah Mehsud warned of increased attacks.

See also 
Violence in Pakistan 2006-09, table and map providing overview of all violence in Pakistan between 2006 and 2009.

References

2009 murders in Pakistan
Suicide bombings in 2009
21st-century mass murder in Pakistan
Suicide bombings in Pakistan
Mass murder in 2009
Attacks on Shiite mosques in Pakistan
Terrorist incidents in Pakistan in 2009
Terrorist incidents in Punjab, Pakistan
April 2009 crimes
Mosque bombings in Pakistan